Krishna Kumar Mishra (also known as Lalu Mishra) was a member of Bihar Legislative Assembly. He was elected twice from Chanpatia Vidhan Sabha constituency in 1990 and 2000. He served as a Minister of Revenue and Land Reforms in the Government of Bihar from 1991 to 1995.

Also see
List of politicians from Bihar

References

Members of the Bihar Legislative Assembly
People from Bihar
People from Bettiah
Union ministers of state of India
1948 births
Living people
Janata Dal politicians
Bharatiya Janata Party politicians from Bihar
Bihari politicians